Sukhumala Marasri (10 May 1861 – 9 July 1927) was a daughter of King Mongkut (Rama IV) and his concubine, Samli (เจ้าคุณจอมมารดาสำลี). Her given name was Princess Sukhumala Marasri (พระองค์เจ้าสุขุมาลมารศรี). She was later one of the four consorts of her half-brother, King Chulalongkorn (Rama V).

Early life

Sukumala was born in Royal Grand Palace on 10 May 1861. She was the 52nd child of King Mongkut. Her mother was consort Samli. She had 5 full siblings, including the famous Princess Napaborn, and from her father's side, she was a half-sister to King Chulalongkorn (later her husband), Queens Sunanda Kumariratana, Savang Vadhana, and Saovabha Phongsri.

When she was ten years old, King Mongkut died and was succeeded by Sukhumala Marasri's half-brother, Prince Chulalongkorn.

Life as queen
Sometime in her teenage years, Sukhumala became a royal wife to King Chulalongkorn. The marriage produced two children; Princess Suddha Dibyaratana (later the Princess of Ratanakosin), who was also the first surviving Chao-Fah, a child of the sovereign which their mother is the Queen Consort or a Princess by blood, and Prince Paribatra Sukhumbandhu (later the Prince of Nakorn Sawan.) During her husband's reign, she served as the King's secretary and was referred to as "the Princess Consort".

After her husband died, she moved to her son's palace, Bang Khun Phrom. During the reign of King Vajiravudh, her nephew, he officially named her as his father's fourth queen consort, making her official title Her Majesty Queen Sukhumala. When Prajadhipok succeeded to the throne, he gave his father's two surviving queens consort, Savang Vadhana and Sukhumala, the title of "the Queen Aunt". In the same style, Sukhumala was preceded by Savang Vadhana, reflecting the fact that Savang Vadhana was created queen consort by Chulalongkorn before Sukhumala.

Queen Consort Sukhumala Marasri died on 9 July 1927 at the age of 66 at the Bang Khun Phrom Palace (H.R.H. Prince Paribatra Sukhumbandhu Palace). Her only surviving child, Prince Paribatra Sukhumbandhu, and her younger full sister, Princess Napaborn, were at her bedside.

Aftermath
In her memory, one district was named "Rajdevi" after Sukumala.

When Prahadhipok abdicated and was succeeded by his nephew, Ananda Mahidol  1935, Sukumala was no longer aunt to the new king, thus she was simply referred to as Her Majesty Queen Sukumala Marasri. Unlike her younger-half sister, Savang Vadhana, who was created "the Queen Grandmother".

Her son, Prince Paribatra Sukhumbandhu was a prominent figure in Siamese politics during the later part of the absolute monarchy, often credited as the man behind King Prajadhipok's throne. The prince served as Minister of the Interior at the time of the Siamese revolution of 1932, and he was captured by the Khana Ratsadon (the People's Party) and placed under arrest. Prajadhipok accepted the demands of the rebels and became a constitutional monarch. Prince Paribatra, however was exiled from Siam. He eventually settled and died in Indonesia, having never returned to his homeland. Mom Rajawongse Sukhumbhand Paribatra, politician and Governor of Bangkok is one of his grandchildren.

Sukumala's younger sister, Princess Napaborn died at the age of 94.

See also
 Chulalongkorn
 Sukhumbhand Paribatra

References

 Paul M. Handley, "The King Never Smiles" Yale University Press: 2006, 

Thai queens consort
Consorts of Chulalongkorn
19th-century Thai women
19th-century Chakri dynasty
20th-century Thai women
20th-century Chakri dynasty
1861 births
1927 deaths
Thai female Phra Ong Chao
Thai princesses consort
Children of Mongkut
Daughters of kings